The 2022–23 season was Arbroath's fourth consecutive season in the Scottish Championship, following their promotion from Scottish League One in the 2018–19 season. They will also compete in the Scottish League Cup, Scottish Challenge Cup and the Scottish Cup.

Competitions

Pre-season

Scottish Championship

Scottish League Cup

Group stage

Knockout phase

Scottish Challenge Cup

Scottish Cup

League table

League Cup table

Transfers

Transfers in

Transfers out

Loans in

Loans out

Notes

References

Arbroath
Arbroath F.C. seasons